Sinopharm Group Co., Ltd. is a Chinese pharmaceutical company. The parent company of Sinopharm Group was Sinopharm Industrial Investment, a 51–49 joint venture of state-owned enterprise China National Pharmaceutical Group and civilian-run enterprise Fosun Pharmaceutical.

Its H shares were listed on the Hong Kong Stock Exchange in 2009, with its IPO price of HK$16 per share. Sinopharm Group's subsidiary Sinopharm CNMC and Sinopharm Accord served as the A share counterpart of the company. However, the A share of Sinopharm Group itself was unlisted.

Sinopharm Group was ranked 829th in 2016 Forbes Global 2000 list.

COVID-19 Vaccine development 

The Sinopharm BIBP COVID-19 vaccine, also known as BBIBP-CorV, the Sinopharm COVID-19 vaccine, or BIBP vaccine, is one of two inactivated virus COVID-19 vaccines developed by Sinopharm. It completed Phase III trials in Argentina, Bahrain, Egypt, Morocco, Pakistan, Peru, and the United Arab Emirates (UAE) with over 60,000 participants. The BIBP vaccine shares similar technology with CoronaVac and Covaxin, other inactivated virus vaccines for COVID-19.

Peer-reviewed results published in JAMA of Phase III trials in United Arab Emirates and Bahrain showed that the BIBP vaccine is 78.1% effective against symptomatic cases and 100% against severe cases (21 cases in vaccinated group vs. 95 cases in placebo group). In December 2020, the UAE previously announced interim results showing 86% efficacy. While mRNA vaccines showed higher efficacy of over 90%, those present distribution challenges for some nations as they require deep-freeze facilities and trucks. BIBP-CorV could be transported and stored at normal refrigerated temperatures.

The BIBP vaccine is being used in vaccination campaigns by certain countries in Asia, Africa, South America, and Europe.  Sinopharm expects to produce one billion doses of the BIBP vaccine in 2021. On 7 May 2021, the World Health Organization approved the vaccine for use in COVAX.

See also
Pharmaceutical industry in China

References

External links
 

Companies listed on the Hong Kong Stock Exchange
Companies based in Shanghai
Government-owned companies of China
Pharmaceutical companies of China
Chinese brands
Fosun International
Pharmaceutical companies established in 2003
Retail companies of China
Chinese companies established in 2004
H shares
Privatization in China